The Mammoth Book of True Crime is a two volume anthology  by British author Colin Wilson. It was published by Carroll & Graf Publishers, Inc., New York, in 1988, .

The first volume is divided alphabetically into sections that reflect the various aspects of crime.

Volume One

A
Acquittals
Alibis
Air Crimes
Arson
Artist's Crimes
Assassination

B
Bandits
Betrayal
Blackmail

C
Cannibalism
Chance in a Million
Children Who Kill
Con Men
Cop Killers
Country Killing
Crimes of Passion

D
Doctors of Death
Dominance
Drugs
Dual Personality

F
Families of Death
Female Murderers
Forgery

G
Gallows Cheats
Gangsters
Gentlemen Crooks
Greed
Gun Deaths

H
Headless Corpses
High School Murder
Hired Killers
Homosexual Murder
Houses of Death
Husband Killers

I
Imposters
Inheritance Crime
Intolerance

J
Justice Delayed

K
Kidnappers
Killer Couples

L
Lady-killers
Left-luggage Murders
Lethal Lawyers
Libel
Lonely Hearts Killers

M
Manic Messiahs
Martyrs
Mass Murderers
Military Murders
Monsters
Motiveless Murder
Murderous Millionaires

O
Occult Detection
Office Crimes

P
Parent Killers
Perverts
Poisoners
Police corruption
Protection Rackets

R
Robber Barons

S
Sabotage
Servants Who Murder
Sleep-walking Slayers
Stick-up Men
Stranglers
Suicide
Super-thieves

T
Train Murders

U
Underworlds
Unwanted Lovers

V
Vicious Triangles
Victims
Vital Clues

W
War Crimes

Books by Colin Wilson
Non-fiction crime books
Crime reference works
1988 non-fiction books
Carroll & Graf books